Sick of It All is the first 7-inch EP recording by New York hardcore punk band Sick of It All. It was the third-ever release via Revelation Records.

Initially, only 4,000 copies of the EP were manufactured (1,000 on standard black vinyl and 1,000 on red vinyl), followed by a limited numbered pressing of 300 copies earmarked for a record convention held at 924 Gilman Street in Berkeley, California, and then a final general-release press run of 2,000 copies. Afterwards, in 1988, eight of these songs were re-recorded and added to their first full-length album release, Blood, Sweat and No Tears, which is generally regarded as a landmark hardcore punk album.

Revelation reissued the EP on both vinyl and CD in 1997 to commemorate its 10th anniversary. SOIA lead singer Lou Koller contributed a special sleeve note to the reissue. The reissue vinyl was deliberately limited to 1,100 black vinyl copies and 102 grey vinyl copies. A final vinyl run of 300 white vinyl copies was released by Revelation in December 2001, and today only the CD edition remains in print.

Track listing

7-inch vinyl EP edition

Side one 
"It's Clobberin' Time/Just Lies"
"Pete's Sake"
"Friends Like You"
"Bullshit Justice"

Side two 
Pay the Price
Pushed Too Far/Give Respect
The Deal
N.S./My Revenge

1997 CD edition 
It's Clobberin' Time
Just Lies
Pete's Sake
Friends Like You
Bullshit Justice
Pay the Price
Pushed Too Far
Give Respect
The Deal
N.S./My Revenge

The song title "It's Clobberin' Time" derives from the catchphrase made famous by the Marvel Comics character The Thing.

Personnel 
Lou Koller – lead and backing vocals
Pete Koller – guitars and backing vocals
Rich Cipriano – bass guitar and backing vocals
Armand Majidi – drums and backing vocals

Note
 On the EP, the band members were identified by their first names only and Majidi's given name is misspelled "Arman".

Production 
Bob Vandermark – recording and mixing engineer
BJ Papas – photography
Jeff Weinraub – artwork

References 

1987 EPs
Sick of It All albums
Revelation Records EPs